Johannes Karavidopoulos (Ιωάννης Καραβιδόπουλος, born 1937) is a Greek New Testament scholar. He is professor of the Theological School at Aristotle University of Thessaloniki. In 1993 he was appointed to the textual committee for the United Bible Societies' Greek New Testament, or Novum Testamentum Graece, at the same time as Barbara Aland, to replace retired earlier committee members Matthew Black and Allen Wikgren.

References

1937 births
New Testament scholars
Greek theologians
Living people